Karabeyli railway station is a railway station in Karabeyli, Kırklareli in Turkey. The station consists of a side platform serving one track. TCDD Taşımacılık operates a daily regional train from Istanbul to Kapıkule that stops at the station.

References

External links
Station timetable

Railway stations in Kırklareli Province
Lüleburgaz District